Pyrgoi (before 1927: Κατράνιτσα - Katranitsa) is a village and a community of the Eordaia municipality. It is located in Northern Greece, in the region of Western Macedonia. Before the 2011 local government reform it was part of the municipality of Vermio, of which it was a municipal district. The 2011 census recorded 768 inhabitants in the village.

History

From classical antiquity to the Roman Empire 
In a location near the village it can be concluded from archeological findings (coins, tombs, inscriptions) that there was an ancient settlement during the Hellenistic and Roman period, which was in control of a route that led from Eordaea to southern Macedonia.

Historian Margaritis Dimitsas in his work "Ancient Geography of Macedonia" places in the region of Pyrgoi the ancient city of Eordaea. He noted "...the capital city of Eordaea was located to the south east of lake Ostrovo. Katranitsa's (Pyrgoi) location seems to be similar to that of the ancient city, which had been maintained until the 10th century, when it was destroyed by Bulgarian invaders. The remnants of the city became Katranitsa.".

Ottoman Empire 
In 1571, after the naval battle of Nafpaktos (October 7, 1571), there were Greek uprisings against the Ottomans in Katranitsa, and all over Macedonia.

During the Ottoman occupation the village flourished so much that it became known as "küçük Istanbul" (small Istanbul) and the Patriarchate upgraded it to a regional bishopric.

Many personalities that were recognized in humanities, sciences and trade were from Katranitsa. Known merchant of Vienna and close partner to Greek revolutionary Rigas Feraios, Christos Manos, founder of the Greek family Christomanos, was born in the village in 1737. Also from Pyrgoi, was the Greek klepht and revolutionary, Goutas, who was active in the 1740s in the regions of Western and Central Macedonia. He was arrested in 1747 in the city of Veria.

The professor of the National and Kapodistrian University of Athens Damianos Georgiou Draskas and Ioannis Karamatas (1864-1913), an important factor of the Hellenic community of Zeumon and founder of the first Greek typography of Serbia (his grandson was the prominent 20th century mathematician Giovan Karamata). From Pyrgoi also was the great diplomat and lawyer Peter Itskos who contributed to the creation of the Serbian state.

According to the findings of Geographers Dimitri Mishev and D. M. Brancoff, the town had a total Christian population of 1.600, of which all were Bulgarian Patriarchist Grecomans.

Greek War of Independence 
During the Greek War of Independence, the inhabitants of Pyrgoi revolted and, in March 1822, 150 fighters under chieftain, Dimitris Karimitsos of Vlasti, exterminated large Ottoman forces in the area. Chieftain Dimitrios Sigaras from Pyrgoi took part in the revolt of Naoussa with his four brothers and 45 fighters from Pyrgoi. Also, from Pyrgoi was the Liaba family, members of which (such as the Emmanuel, Stergios, Constantine and George brothers) fought and died in the Naoussa massacre in 1822.

Macedonian Struggle 

In the period of the Macedonian struggle, the town of Katranitsa (Pyrgoi) was used by Greek guerrillas as a base of excursion. The Greek Macedonian pharmacist Filippos Kapetanopoulos, who worked in Monastir and was a close associate of Pavlos Mela, was from Pyrgoi. He was killed fighting with the guerrilla body of Pavlos Melas, on September 19, 1904, just outside of Polipotamos, Florina.

Other Greeks from Pyrgoi who took part in the Macedonia struggle were Harisios Vantkoukis, Anastasios Vasdekis (1847-1931), Konstantinos Vasdekis, Markos Georgiou, Ioannis Kapetanopoulos, Petros Nicolaides, Antonios Pagiantsas, Stavros Hadjimitsos. They were involved in the armed phase of the Macedonian Struggle, most were part of  Hellenic Macedonian Committee of Defense against the Bulgarians.

Finally, the Pyrgoi inhabitants: Michael Giorou, Antonios Dimou, Theodosios Theodorou, Thomas Kapetanopoulos, Michael Vasdekis (or Basdekis), Nikolaos Bitsiou, Michael Paraschou, Petros Paraschou, Georgios Sionis, Ioannis Stamboulis, Stavros Tsitsis, Markos Hadjitaskou and Stavros Hadjitaskou, were killed with axes by Bulgarian units on Mount Vermio on April 21, 1906.

Ottoman rule ended in Pyrgoi during the Balkan wars (1912-1913) and it became part of the Kingdom of Greece.

Interwar period

The Greek census (1920) recorded 2,180 people in the village and in 1923 there were 1,100 inhabitants who were Muslim. Following the Greek-Turkish population exchange, in 1926 within the village there were 53 refugee families from Asia Minor and 99 refugee families from Pontus. The Greek census (1928) recorded 1,490 village inhabitants. There were 139 refugee families (501 people) in 1928.

Second World War (the Pyrgoi massacre) 

On April 24, 1944 there was a massacre of civilians by German Nazis and their local accomplices. It was the second largest German-related massacre of Greece after that of Kalavryta. The events were later the subject of dozens of documentaries and generated wide interest. Among the atrocities that were committed, 368 men women and children were killed and burned alive. Colonel Karl Schümers of 7th SS Panzer Grenadier Regiment was responsible for the massacres at Pyrgoi, Kleisoura Kastoria, and Distomo Boeotia which in total included over 1,000 men, women and children. The town was completely destroyed and survivors were forced to walk to Ptolemaida.  An annual memorial ceremony is held for the victims, where the president of Democracy of Greece visits the village.

Notable people
Petar Ičko, Ottoman and Serbian diplomat
Filippos Kapetanopoulos, pharmacist, fighter in the Macedonian Struggle
Anastassios Christomanos, university professor and chemist
Antonios Christomanos, university professor, doctor, politician
Constantine Christomanos, novelist, poet, theatrical writer
Chirstos Manos, entrepreneur
Captain Goutas, Greek revolutionary, klepht

References

Δημ. Κ. Σαμσάρης, Ιστορική γεωγραφία της ρωμαϊκής επαρχίας Μακεδονίας (Το τμήμα της σημερινής Δυτικής Μακεδονίας), Θεσσαλονίκη 1989 (έκδ. Εταιρείας Μακεδονικών Σπουδών), σ. 177-178. .

Populated places in Kozani (regional unit)